The 2011 Mauritian League (also known as Barclays League for sponsorship reasons) was the sixty-seventh season of the Mauritian League since its establishment in 1935. The 2011 fixtures were released in February 2011. The season began on 26 February 2011, and concluded on 26 June 2011. ASPL 2000 won the 2011 Mauritian League, winning their 5th title, their first since 2005.

Due to the preparation of the Mauritius national football team for the 2011 edition of the Indian Ocean Games, the season was shortened. From the 14 teams originally competing (Etoile de L'Ouest was later removed from the league, see Controversies), the top eight qualified for a new professional league, named the Super League, to begin play after the conclusion of the Indian Ocean Island Games in 2012. The rest of the teams were placed into the new Premier Division, which will start play at the same time. Centre Technique National François-Blaquart are not subject to promotion or relegation. The restructuring of the Mauritian league system was done in an attempt to further professionalize Mauritian football.

Rule changes
The league introduced a cap on the number of foreign players in a squad. From this season onwards, clubs will have to declare a squad of no more than three players of foreign origin, in an attempt to encourage the growth of Mauritian footballers. The league now also uses CD Narsil technologies to record transfers. This is in compliance with mandates issued by FIFA.

To compete in the league, teams have to have either a club house or a room equipped with telephone, fax, and/or e-mail with a full-time administrative secretary. They must also have a permanent training ground, preferably equipped with projectors. The team must have at least 12 players signed to a professional contract, and each team must have a U-20 youth team. The MFA will also require that teams hire a qualified coach, holding at least a C license, a doctor and a physio.

The allocation fees for each team also increased. 1,000,000 rupees were allocated to each team.

Teams
All of the Mauritian League teams submitted their squads on the 31 January 2011 deadline.

A total of fourteen teams competed in the league this year, including twelve sides from the 2010 Mauritian League and two promoted teams from the 2010 National Second Division. Late into the season, Etoile de L'Ouest was removed from the league (see Controversies).

U.S. Bassin-Beau/Rose Hill were relegated to their regional league. Cercle de Joachim and U.S. Highlands were promoted to the Mauritian league.

Stadia and locations

Personnel
Note: Flags indicate national team as has been defined under FIFA eligibility rules. Players and Managers may hold more than one non-FIFA nationality.

Managerial changes

League table
 1st to 8th qualify for the new Super League, beginning play in 2012
 9th to 14th will compete in the new National 1st Division, beginning play in 2012 as well
 Centre Technique National François-Blaquart is not subject to promotion/relegation
 Results for all teams against Etoile de L'Ouest were nullified after the latter was removed from the league by the MFA (see Controversies)

Results
Before Etoile de L'Ouest were removed from the league, each team was to play 13 games, for a total of 91 games. After Etoile de L'Ouest was removed, each team ended up playing a total of 12 games for a total of 78 games. All results involving Etoile de L'Ouest were nullified in relation to final standings.

Controversies
On 5 March 2011, after a game in which ASPL 2000 beat AS Rivière du Rempart 2–0, ASRR accused ASPL 2000 of fielding an ineligible player, Jonathan Ernest, due to yellow card accumulation. The MFA looked into the matter, and ruled in favor of ASRR, suspending Ernest for two weeks and forcing the game to be replayed in May. ASPL 2000 won that game as well 1–0.

On 8 June 2011, after a game in which Petite Rivière Noire SC beat ASPL 2000 2–1, ASPL 2000 accused Petite Rivière Noire of fielding an ineligible player, Stéphane Badul, due to yellow card accumulation. Ironically, ASPL 2000 had been accused of the same thing two months prior. The MFA once again looked into the case, and once again ruled in favor of the accuser. This time, however, the punishment was much harsher, as they suspended Badul for six months (putting his chances of representing Mauritius in the 2011 IOG in the air) and fining Petite Rivière Noire 3000 rupees. ASPL 2000 was also awarded the game 3–0. Petite Rivière Noire expressed outrage at how harsh the penalty was, while the Ernest incident resulted in far less consequences. After this case, the MFA agreed to look back into the Ernest case, which was very similar but much more lenient on the accused.

On 22 June 2011, after a meeting was held by the National Managing Committee of the MFA, it was determined that Etoile de L'Ouest SC was not fit to compete in the Mauritian League after losing by wide margins in the previous few games and being very unprofessional, which included fielding only 8 players in one game. With immediate effect, the team was removed from the league and all games that the team played were nullified.

Republic Cup
On 13 March 2011, the Republic Cup was played between Pamplemousses SC and Petite Rivière Noire SC.

References

External links
 RSSSF
 Season on soccerway

Mauritian Premier League seasons
Mauritius
Mauritius
1